Chisholm Trail Casino is a casino that opened in Duncan, Oklahoma in October, 2004. The  casino is owned and operated by the Chickasaw Nation and is open 24 hours daily.  Located along the site of the historic Chisholm Trail cattle drive, the casino is five miles north of downtown Duncan on Highway 81, south of Highway 7. Chisholm Trail is owned and operated by the Chickasaw Nation. The casino is 70 miles south of Norman, Oklahoma and the Nation’s sister gaming facility, Riverwind Casino. Chisholm Trail is 100 miles northwest of WinStar World Casino, another Chickasaw Nation gaming center, located in Thackerville, Oklahoma.

Games
Chisholm Trail Casino offers more than 550 gaming machines and tables for Blackjack, 3-card Poker and Ultimate Texas Hold 'Em.

Dining
The 22,000-square-foot facility also includes a full-service restaurant and bar, Aces. Aces is open 7 days a week and features menu items like burgers, salads, meatloaf, chicken tenders and more. There is also a smoke shop and Rustic Trail Gift Shop at the facility. Chisholm Trail Casino is near by several hotels and motels, including Hampton Inn, Chisholm Suites, Quality Inn and Days Inn.

References

External links 
Chisholm Trail Casino Website

Chickasaw Nation casinos
Casinos in Oklahoma
Tourist attractions in Stephens County, Oklahoma
Buildings and structures in Stephens County, Oklahoma